Albu may refer to:

Albu (surname)
Albu Parish, municipality in Järva County, Estonia
Albu, Estonia, village in Albu Parish
Albu Salih, an Arabic tribe
Albu River, a tributary of the Pârgavu River, Romania

See also
Pârâul lui Albu
Albus (disambiguation)
Albos (disambiguation)